Benaissa Benamar (born 8 April 1997) is a Dutch professional footballer who plays as a centre-back for Eredivisie club Volendam.

Club career

Early years
Benamar played in the youth departments of Dutch clubs VVA/Spartaan, Ajax, AFC, Volendam, Zeeburgia and ADO Den Haag. Between 2016 and 2018, he played for Jong FC Twente, the second-team of FC Twente with whom he suffered relegation from the Tweede Divisie to the Derde Divisie in his first season. 

In 2018, Jong FC Twente was removed from the Dutch football pyramid, and Benamar left for Moroccan club Ittihad Tanger. At Ittihad, he made six appearances in the top-tier Botola Pro 1, and also played in the CAF Champions League and CAF Confederation Cup.

Telstar
In 2019, Benamar signed a two-year contract with Dutch second-tier Eerste Divisie club SC Telstar after a successful trial. He immediately established himself as a starter in defense and made 28 appearances during the 2019–20 season, in which he scored three goals. In September 2020, Italian Serie A club Sassuolo showed their interest in signing Benamar, but ultimately could not agree with Telstar on a transfer sum.

Utrecht
On 6 January 2021, it was announced that Benamar had signed a two-year contract with FC Utrecht, with an option for two additional years.

Volendam
On 13 January 2022, Benamar returned to Volendam on loan until the end of the season. The loan had a conditional obligation to buy in case of Volendam's promotion to Eredivisie. Volendam were promoted at the end of the 2021–22 season, triggering the option.

Benamar scored on his Eredivisie debut for Volendam, heading in a corner from Daryl van Mieghem to secure the 2–2 final score on the first matchday of the 2022–23 season.

References

External links
 
 

1997 births
Living people
Moroccan footballers
Morocco youth international footballers
Association football defenders
People from Nador
AFC Ajax players
Amsterdamsche FC players
FC Volendam players
A.V.V. Zeeburgia players
ADO Den Haag players
Jong FC Twente players
Ittihad Tanger players
SC Telstar players
FC Utrecht players
Botola players
Eerste Divisie players
Eredivisie players